Victor Edward Hadfield (born October 4, 1940) is a Canadian former professional ice hockey player. He played sixteen years in the National Hockey League (NHL), spending thirteen with the New York Rangers and three with the Pittsburgh Penguins.

Early career
Hadfield played all of his minor hockey in Oakville before moving to the Dixie Bee Hives for one season. He was signed by the Chicago Black Hawks and assigned to their junior league affiliate, the St. Catharines Teepees of the Ontario Hockey League.  He established himself as a physical presence, tallying many more penalty minutes than points.  With a strong squad in 1959–60 that included future notable NHL players Chico Maki, Roger Crozier and Pat Stapleton, he averaged a point a game in the regular season and playoffs, and racked up an average of five penalty minutes a game in the playoffs en route to the Teepees' second Memorial Cup championship.

He was assigned to Chicago's Buffalo Bisons farm team in the American Hockey League the following season.  He was left unprotected after the 1961–62 season and claimed by the Rangers in the intra-league draft.

NHL career
By the 1963–64 season, Hadfield had secured a place in the Rangers' lineup as an enforcer.  Over time he concentrated more on scoring than on fighting, especially with feared enforcer Reggie Fleming on the team.  He joined teammates Jean Ratelle and Rod Gilbert to form the famous GAG line (which stood for "goal a game").  From the 1967–68 season on Hadfield always scored at least 20 goals in any full season.

Hadfield's best season was 1971–72.  Named the team's captain after the trade of longtime captain Bob Nevin, he became the first Ranger - and only the sixth NHL player - to score 50 goals in a season, nearly doubling his previous best marks; with his linemates Ratelle and Gilbert, the GAG Line totalled 139 goals and 325 points en route to the Stanley Cup Finals.

The Rangers signed Hadfield to a controversial and lucrative contract the following summer to deter him from defecting to the newly created World Hockey Association.  He scored fewer points thereafter and was traded after the 1973–74 season to the Pittsburgh Penguins for defenceman Nick Beverley.  He scored thirty goals in each of his two full seasons for the Penguins although he was plagued by injuries and weight troubles.   Near the end of the 1975–76 season he sustained a knee injury which forced his retirement.

Retirement
At the time of his retirement, Hadfield was fourth in Rangers' franchise history in goals, assists and points (behind his linemates Jean Ratelle and Rod Gilbert, and Andy Bathgate), second in penalty minutes (behind Harry Howell) and fourth in games played (behind Ratelle, Howell and Gilbert).  He currently stands ninth in scoring and third in penalty minutes in the Rangers history.

His younger brother, Carl, was drafted in 1964 by the Chicago Black Hawks.

Hadfield now owns the Vic Hadfield Driving Range and instructional centre in Oakville, Ontario.

In the 2009 book 100 Ranger Greats, the authors ranked Hadfield at No. 20 all-time of the 901 New York Rangers who had played during the team's first 82 seasons.

The Rangers retired Hadfield's #11 jersey on December 2, 2018.

International play
After his stellar 1971–72 season, Hadfield was named to Team Canada for the 1972 Summit Series.  After playing sparingly in just two games, he left the team after the Swedish exhibition games and returned home to Canada, drawing criticism for his move.

Personal life
Vic's grandson Victor Hadfield is an ice hockey defenseman with the Jacksonville Icemen of the ECHL.  Victor previously played for the Barrie Colts of the OHL and the Manitoba Moose of the AHL.

Career statistics

Regular season and playoffs

International

Awards and achievements
 OHA-Jr. first All-Star team (1960)
 NHL Second All-Star team (1972)
 Played in NHL All-Star Game (1965, 1972)

See also
 List of NHL players with 1000 games played
 List of NHL players with 100-point seasons

References

External links
 

1940 births
Living people
Baltimore Clippers players
Buffalo Bisons (AHL) players
Canadian ice hockey left wingers
Edmonton Oilers scouts
Ice hockey people from Ontario
New York Rangers players
Pittsburgh Penguins players
Sportspeople from Oakville, Ontario
St. Catharines Teepees players
Canadian expatriate ice hockey players in the United States